Nicholson is an unincorporated community in Kenton County, Kentucky, United States, located directly south of Independence.

Geography
Nicholson is centered at the intersection of Kentucky Routes 17 and 16.

Government
Emergency Medical Services, fire prevention and suppression is provided by the Independence Fire District with policing provided by the Kenton County Police.

Library

The William E. Durr branch of the Kenton County Public Library is located in the Nicholson area.  Opened in January 2007, it replaced the Independence Branch (1994–2006) on Taylor Mill Road.  Its collection includes over 100,000 items.

External links
Independence Fire District
Kenton County Public Library

Unincorporated communities in Kenton County, Kentucky
Unincorporated communities in Kentucky